George Sugihara (born in Tokyo, Japan) is currently a professor of biological oceanography in the Physical Oceanography Research Division at the Scripps Institution of Oceanography, where he is the inaugural holder of the McQuown Chair in Natural Science.  Sugihara is a theoretical biologist who works across a variety of fields ranging from ecology and  landscape ecology, to epidemiology, to genetics, to geoscience and atmospheric science, to quantitative finance and economics.

His work involves inductive theoretical approaches to understanding nature from observational data.  The general approach is different from most theory and involves  minimalist inductive theory – Inductive data-driven explorations of nature using minimal assumptions. The aim is to avoid inevitable assumptions of deductive first-principle models and produce an understanding that passes the validation test of out-of-sample prediction. His initial work on fisheries as complex, chaotic systems led to work on financial networks and prediction of chaotic systems.

Other notable research relates some of his early work on topology and assembly in ecological systems to recent work on social systems and work on generic early warning signs of critical transitions that apply across many apparently different classes of systems.

Biography

George Sugihara studied Natural Resources at the University of Michigan, where he received a B.S. in 1973.  He did something after graduation, but returned to Ann Arbor to take graduate courses in mathematics.  In 1978, he matriculated at Princeton University, where he studied mathematical ecology under the supervision of Robert May, earning an M.S. in biology in 1980 and PhD in mathematical biology in 1983.  While at Princeton, he was awarded the Ogden Porter Jacobus Prize, Princeton University Graduate School's highest academic honor.

Sugihara started his career as Wigner Prize Fellow at Oak Ridge National Laboratory and concurrently associate professor of Mathematics at the University of Tennessee.  In 1986, he joined Scripps Institution of Oceanography (SIO).  From 1997–2002, Sugihara took leave from SIO to work in Deutsche Bank on quantitative finance becoming a Managing Director.

Sugihara has been a visiting professor at Cornell University, Imperial College London, Kyoto University and the Tokyo Institute of Technology, and was a visiting fellow at Merton College, Oxford University in 2002. He is recipient of several national and international awards, and is currently a member of the National Academy of Sciences Board on Mathematical Sciences and its Applications, a National Research Council advisory board that advises government agencies and guides the nation’s mathematics agenda to better serve national needs.  He held the UC San Diego John Dove Isaacs Chair in Natural Philosophy from 1990 to 1995 and has been McQuown Professor of Natural Science at SIO since 2007.

He is one of 18 members of the National Academies Board on Mathematical Sciences and their Applications, and was a Managing Director at Deutsche Bank. He helped found Prediction Company (sold to UBS) and Quantitative Advisors LLC. He has been a consultant to the Bank of England, the Federal Reserve Bank of New York, and to the Federal Reserve System on questions of international security: systemic risk in the financial sector.

Research interests
His research interests include complexity theory, nonlinear dynamics, Cryptic Pathology, food web structure, species abundance patterns, conservation biology, biological control, empirical climate modelling, fisheries forecasting, and the design and implementation of derivatives markets for fisheries.

One of his most interdisciplinary contributions involves the work he developed with Robert May concerning methods for forecasting nonlinear and chaotic systems. This took him into the arena of investment banking at Deutsche Bank, where he applied these theoretical methods to forecast erratic market behavior.

References

Living people
Theoretical biologists
University of Michigan School of Natural Resources and Environment alumni
Princeton University alumni
University of California, San Diego faculty
People from Scarsdale, New York
Scarsdale High School alumni
1949 births
People from Tokyo
Japanese emigrants to the United States